Luís Wittnich Carrisso (14 February 1886 – 14 June 1937) was a Portuguese botanist, professor at the University of Coimbra.

Carrisso was born in Figueira da Foz. He attended the Faculty of Philosophy of University of Coimbra (1904-1910). After graduating he became a student of botanist Julio Augusto Henriques. Carrisso took interest in evolution and heredity and presented his PhD thesis Hereditariedade in 1911. He published scientific work on ecology and plant systematics.

In 1918, he became Professor of Botany at University of Coimbra's Botanical Garden. He was a supporter of Charles Darwin's theory of evolution but was skeptical of the role of natural selection. He embraced mutationism. 

He died on 6 June 1937 in the Namib desert (Moçâmedes), in Angola, of cardiac syncope, during his third botanical expedition to that country. A monument was erected at the site in his memory.

Eponymy
Carrissoa

References

External links
Jorge Guimarães: Carrisso, Luís Wittnich, 1886-1937
JSTOR: Carrisso, Luis Wettnich (1886-1937)
Fátima Sales (2007): Luís Carrisso

1886 births
People from Figueira da Foz
1937 deaths
Mutationism
20th-century Portuguese botanists
Portuguese people of German descent